Entephria cyanata is a moth of the family Geometridae. It was described by Jacob Hübner in 1809. It is found in Europe, from the Netherlands, east to Poland and Belarus, south to the Balkans and Greece, west to Italy and Spain. It is also found in the Near East and North Africa.

Adults are on wing from June to August depending on the location.

Subspecies
Entephria cyanata cyanata
Entephria cyanata petronensis

References

External links

Lepiforum e.V.

Larentiini
Moths of Europe
Taxa named by Jacob Hübner